Eric Werge Hamber  (1879–1960) was a Canadian businessman and the 15th Lieutenant Governor of British Columbia.

Early life
Born on April 21, 1879, in Winnipeg, Manitoba,  as a youth he was an excellent athlete who shone in his school rowing, rugby, football, and hockey teams. His first job was as a junior clerk with The Dominion Bank, and he moved to Vancouver, British Columbia, to open a new branch in 1907. On May 14, 1912, he married Aldyen Hendry and began work at the BC Mills Timber and Trading Company, a company owned by Aldyen's father John Hendry. Hamber later became the company's president.

In 1934 he built the Tudor Revival style, Minnekhada Lodge, in Coquitlam as a country retreat and hunting lodge. The land is now managed by Metro Vancouver Parks.

Public office
On May 1, 1936, he became Lieutenant Governor of British Columbia, achieving considerable popularity. He left office in 1941 and accepted the position of Chancellor of the University of British Columbia in 1944, a position he held for seven years. In 1946, he was made a Companion of the Order of St Michael and St George.

He died on January 10, 1960.

Other information
Both Eric Hamber Secondary School and one of the residences in Place Vanier on the UBC Vancouver campus are named after Eric Hamber.  The Hamber Provincial Park on the BC side of the Canadian Rockies and Theatre BC's most prestigious award also bear his name.

When Queen Elizabeth II was married in 1947, Hamber and his wife were the only Canadian private guests.

References

External links
Eric Werge Hamber
May Queens & Court: New Westminster Public Library Heritage Photo Tour
"City of Vancouver Archives MI-136, video of a party at the Hamber residence, 1927"
"City of Vancouver Archives MI-153, video of the visit of Governor-General with Mr. and Mrs. E. W. Hamber to the Britannia Mines, 1932"

1879 births
1960 deaths
Chancellors of the University of British Columbia
Canadian Companions of the Order of St Michael and St George
Lieutenant Governors of British Columbia
Businesspeople from Winnipeg
Burials at Mountain View Cemetery (Vancouver)